Dobrianychi, also written as Dobryanichi or Dobrjanici, is a village in Lviv Oblast near the town of Peremyshliany in Ukraine. Dobrianychi is formed from the village of Dobrianychi and the villages of Ploska (Плоска) and Tutschne (Тучне).

Famous natives
 Wilhelm Reich (1897–1957), psychoanalyst

External links
Google Maps Location. 
A Ukrainian map of the location and surroundings

Villages in Lviv Raion